Dmitry Grigoryev may refer to
Dmitry Grigoryev (businessman) (born 1975), Russian businessman
Dmitry Grigoryev (swimmer) (born 1992), Russian Paralympic swimmer